Eucosma metana is a species of moth of the family Tortricidae. It is found in Shanghai, China.

References

Moths described in 1919
Eucosmini